Manuel Rivas Barrós (born 24 October 1957 in A Coruña, Spain) is a Galician writer, poet and journalist.

Biography
Manuel Rivas Barrós began his writing career at the age of 15. He has written articles and literary essays for Spanish newspapers and television stations including Television de Galicia, El Ideal Gallego, La Voz de Galicia, El País, and was the sub-editor of Diario 16 in Galicia. 
He was a founding member of Greenpeace Spain, and played an important role during the 2002 Prestige oil spill near the Galician coast.

Work
As of 2017, Rivas has published 9 anthologies of poetry, 14 novels and several literature essays. He is considered a revolutionary in contemporary Galician literature. His 1996 book ¿Que me queres, amor?, a series of sixteen short stories, was adapted by director José Luis Cuerda for his film A lingua das bolboretas La lengua de las mariposas ("Butterfly"). His 1998 novel O lapis do carpinteiro has been published in nine countries and is the most widely translated work in the history of Galician literature. It also was adapted to cinema as O lapis do carpinteiro.

Bibliography 

Poems
Libro de Entroido (1979)
Balada nas praias do Oeste (1985)
Mohicania (1987)
Ningún cisne (1989)
O pobo da noite (1996)
Do descoñecido ao descoñecido. Obra poética (1980-2003) (2003)
El pueblo de la noche y mohicania revisitada. (2004)
A desaparición da neve. (2009)
A boca da terra. (2015)

Novels
Todo ben (1985)
Un millón de vacas (1989), premio da Crítica
Os comedores de patacas (1991)
En salvaxe compaña (1994)
¿Qué me quieres, amor? (1996)
Bala perdida (1997)
O lapis do carpinteiro (1998) ("The Carpenter's Pencil" (2003))
Ela, maldita alma (1999)
A man dos paíños (2000)
Galicia, Galicia (2001)
As chamadas perdidas (2002)
Contos de Nadal (2004)
Os libros arden mal (2006) ("Books Burn Badly" (2010))
Todo é silencio (2010) ("All is Silence" (2013))
As voces baixas (2012) ("The Low Voices" (2017))

Essays
"El bonsái atlántico" (1994)
"El periodismo es un cuento" (1997)
"Toxos e flores" (1999)
"Galicia, Galicia" (2001)

Awards 

 Galician Critics Prize
 Spanish National Narrative Prize
 Spanish Critic Prize
 Prize of the Belgian section of Amnesty International
 Torrente Ballester Prize
 Arcebispo Xoán de San Clemente e o da Crítica Prize
 ONCE Prize - Galicia and Solidarity
 Xarmenta 2007

References

External links 
Manuel Rivas bio and articles at El Pais 
Manuel Rivas interview Radio y Televisión Española 10 February 2010, 55 min (Spanish)
Artigo provocado pola catástrofe do Prestige
A commentary on the anthology of poems A desaparición da neve (Alfaguara, 12 Sept 2009) in French and Spanish
O máis estraño, blog

1957 births
Living people
Spanish male writers
Writers from Galicia (Spain)
People associated with Greenpeace
Diario 16 people
El País columnists